Rugby sevens at the 2020 Summer Olympics in Tokyo took place from 26 July to 31 July 2021 at the Tokyo Stadium. 24 teams (12 each for men and women) competed in the tournament. The dates were modified due to the postponement of the Tokyo 2020 games as a result of the COVID-19 pandemic.

Competition
The men's and women's rugby sevens competitions took place at Tokyo Stadium, a 2019 Rugby World Cup host venue. The men's sessions took place July 26–28 with the women's sessions happening July 29–31, 2021.

Changes
In a reverse to the 2016 schedule, the men's competition was played first over three days from July 27–29 with the women's competition taking place from July 30 through August 1 and culminating with the gold medal session.

There were two sessions on each competition day. The morning session kicked-off at 9 AM JST and ran until midday JST and the evening session began at 4:30 PM and finished at 7 PM. The medal matches took place in the evening sessions.

Qualification summary

Men's

Women's 

 Notes:

Competition schedule

Medal summary

Medal table

Winners

Men's competition

Group stage

Group A

Group B

Group C

Knockout stage

Medal playoff

Women's competition

Group stage

Group A

Group B

Group C

Knockout stage

Medal playoff

See also
Wheelchair rugby at the 2020 Summer Paralympics

References

External links
 
 Results book 

 
2020
2020 Summer Olympics events
Olympics